Charles Archibald Hahn (September 14, 1880 – January 21, 1955) was an American track athlete and is widely regarded as one of the best sprinters of the early 20th century. He is the first athlete to win both the 100m and 200m race at the same Olympic Games.

Biography
Having won sprint events at the 1903 American and Canadian championships, Hahn— born in Dodgeville, Wisconsin, but running for the University of Michigan— was among the favorites at the 1904 Olympic Games in St. Louis, which was poorly attended by European athletes.

In the first event at those Games, the 60 m, Hahn benefited from his quick start and won, making him a favorite for the remaining events he was entered in, the 100 m and 200 m. His run in the 200 m final delivered him the gold and a good time, although the latter was flattered, because the race was run on a straight course. In his third event, he again outclassed the field, thus winning all sprint events.

In 1906, the "Milwaukee Meteor" repeated his Olympic 100 m victory in Athens, a feat not equaled until 1988, when Carl Lewis won the 100 m twice in a row (after the disqualification of Ben Johnson). In 1910 he outran a racehorse in a 50-yard dash at the Wisconsin State Fair.

After his running career, Hahn became a coach and wrote the classic book How to Sprint issued by the Spalding Athletic Library collection which was published by American Sports Publishing Co.  He coached track and number of other sports at Pacific University in Forest Grove, Oregon, Monmouth College in Monmouth, Illinois, Whitman College, Brown University, Michigan, Princeton University, and the University of Virginia.  At Virginia he led the Cavaliers to 12 state championships in 13 years.  He died in 1955, in Charlottesville, Virginia.

In 1929 Hahn's book "How to Sprint" was issued by the Spalding Athletic Library.  

Hahn was elected to the Wisconsin Athletic Hall of Fame in 1959.  He was inducted into the University of Michigan Athletic Hall of Honor in 1984 and the Virginia Sports Hall of Fame in 1991.

References

External links
 
 Virginia Sports Hall of Fame profile
 
 dataOlympics profile
 

1880 births
1955 deaths
American male sprinters
Brown Bears football coaches
Brown Bears track and field coaches
Michigan Wolverines football coaches
Michigan Wolverines men's track and field athletes
Michigan Wolverines track and field coaches
Monmouth Fighting Scots football coaches
Monmouth Fighting Scots men's basketball coaches
Pacific Boxers football coaches
Princeton Tigers track and field coaches
Virginia Cavaliers football coaches
Virginia Cavaliers track and field coaches
Whitman Fighting Missionaries football coaches
Athletes (track and field) at the 1904 Summer Olympics
Athletes (track and field) at the 1906 Intercalated Games
College boxing coaches in the United States
Olympic gold medalists for the United States in track and field
People from Dodgeville, Wisconsin
People from Portage, Wisconsin
Sportspeople from Wisconsin
Medalists at the 1904 Summer Olympics
Medalists at the 1906 Intercalated Games
USA Outdoor Track and Field Championships winners